Monsoon is a 1952 American drama film directed by Rod Amateau and written by Leo Townsend and Forrest Judd, David Robinson and Leonardo Bercovici. The film stars Ursula Thiess, Diana Douglas, George Nader, Ellen Corby, Philip Stainton, Myron Healey and Eric Pohlmann. It was released on December 14, 1952 by United Artists.

Plot
A young woman named Julia brings her fiancé and his mother to a village in India to meet her father and brother. Hospitality proves in short supply and things take a turn for the worse when Julia's seductive younger sister arrives.

Cast 
Ursula Thiess as Jeanette
Diana Douglas as Julia
George Nader as Burton
Ellen Corby as Katie
Philip Stainton as Putsi
Myron Healey as Rault
Eric Pohlmann as Molac

References

External links 
 

1952 films
United Artists films
American drama films
1952 drama films
Films based on works by Jean Anouilh
Films directed by Rod Amateau
Films set in India
American films based on plays
1950s English-language films
1950s American films